The 1989 Soviet First League was the 50th season of the second-tier round-robin competitions of association football in the Soviet Union.

Teams

Promoted teams
FC Fakel Voronezh – Winner of the Second League finals (returning after an absence of a season)
FC Nistru Chisinau – Winner of the Second League finals (returning after an absence of 2 seasons)
FC Torpedo Kutaisi – Winner of the Second League finals (returning after an absence of a season)

Relegated teams 
FC Kairat Almaty – (Returning after 5 seasons)
FC Neftchi Baku – (Returning after 13 seasons)

Locations

League standings

Top scorers

Number of teams by union republic

See also
 Soviet First League

External links
 1989. First League. (1989. Первая лига.) Luhansk Nash Futbol.

Soviet First League seasons
2
Soviet
Soviet